Lakeland Shores is a city in Washington County, Minnesota, United States. The population was 311 at the 2010 census.

Geography
County 18 serves as a main route.

Demographics

2010 census
As of the census of 2010, there were 311 people, 117 households, and 84 families living in the city. The racial makeup of the city was 99.0% White, 0.3% Asian, 0.3% from other races, and 0.3% from two or more races. Hispanic or Latino of any race were 1.3% of the population.

There were 117 households, of which 29.1% had children under the age of 18 living with them, 65.8% were married couples living together, 4.3% had a female householder with no husband present, 1.7% had a male householder with no wife present, and 28.2% were non-families. 17.1% of all households were made up of individuals, and 4.3% had someone living alone who was 65 years of age or older. The average household size was 2.66 and the average family size was 3.10.

The median age in the city was 46.6 years. 22.8% of residents were under the age of 18; 5.5% were between the ages of 18 and 24; 19.5% were from 25 to 44; 42.5% were from 45 to 64; and 9.6% were 65 years of age or older. The gender makeup of the city was 50.2% male and 49.8% female.

2000 census
As of the census of 2000, there were 355 people, 116 households, and 93 families living in the city. The racial makeup of the city was 99.72% White, and 0.28% from two or more races. Hispanic or Latino of any race were 1.41% of the population.

There were 116 households, out of which 50.0% had children under the age of 18 living with them, 75.0% were married couples living together, 4.3% had a female householder with no husband present, and 19.8% were non-families. 16.4% of all households were made up of individuals, and 7.8% had someone living alone who was 65 years of age or older.  The average household size was 3.06 and the average family size was 3.48.

In the city, the population was spread out, with 31.0% under the age of 18, 7.6% from 18 to 24, 23.4% from 25 to 44, 29.9% from 45 to 64, and 8.2% who were 65 years of age or older.  The median age was 38 years. For every 100 females, there were 117.8 males.  For every 100 females age 18 and over, there were 104.2 males.

The median income for a household in the city was $80,907, and the median income for a family was $83,632. Males had a median income of $55,000 versus $35,000 for females. The per capita income for the city was $29,789.  About 1.9% of families and 3.9% of the population were below the poverty line, including 4.5% of those under age 18 and 7.7% of those age 65 or over.

References

Cities in Minnesota
Cities in Washington County, Minnesota